Mariah Carey (born March 27, 1969) is an American singer, songwriter, record producer, and actress. Referred to as the "Songbird Supreme" by Guinness World Records, she is noted for her five-octave vocal range, melismatic singing style, improvisation skills, her signature use of the whistle register, and songwriting. Carey is famous for the enduring popularity of her holiday music, particularly the 1994 song "All I Want for Christmas Is You", and she has been dubbed the "Queen of Christmas". Carey rose to fame in 1990 with her debut album Mariah Carey. She was the first artist to have their first five singles reach number one on the Billboard Hot 100, from "Vision of Love" to "Emotions". An inductee into the Songwriters Hall of Fame, she is credited for inspiring several generations of pop and R&B artists, and for merging hip hop with pop music through her crossover collaborations.

Carey's self-titled debut album was released under the guidance of Columbia Records executive Tommy Mottola in 1990, and the two married in 1993. She gained further worldwide success with the albums Music Box (1993)  and Daydream (1995). Their singles include "Hero", "Without You", "Fantasy", "Always Be My Baby", and "One Sweet Day", which topped the US Billboard Hot 100 decade-end chart (1990s) and was the longest running number one song of the decade. After separating from Mottola, Carey adopted a new urban image and incorporated more elements of hip hop with the album Butterfly (1997). She left Columbia in 2001 after eleven consecutive years of US number-one singles and signed a $100 million record deal with Virgin Records.

Following Carey's highly publicized physical and emotional breakdown and the failure of the film Glitter (2001) and its soundtrack, Virgin bought out her contract and she signed with Island Records the following year. After a comparatively unsuccessful period, Carey returned to the top of the charts with The Emancipation of Mimi (2005), which became the best-selling album in the US and the world's second best-selling album of 2005. Its second single, "We Belong Together", topped the US Billboard Hot 100 decade-end chart (2000s). Billboard named it the "song of the decade" and is the fifteenth most popular song of all time. She won the Breakthrough Actress Performance award at the Palm Springs International Film Festival for her role in the 2009 film Precious. Carey's subsequent ventures included being an American Idol judge, starring in the docu-series Mariah's World, appearing in the films The Butler (2013), A Christmas Melody (2015), and The Lego Batman Movie (2017), performing at two Las Vegas concert residencies, and publishing her memoir The Meaning of Mariah Carey in 2020.

Carey is one of the best-selling music artists of all time, with over 220 million records sold worldwide. In 2008, she was named one of Time's annual 100 most influential people in the world. Billboard named her the "top-charting female solo artist", based on both album and song chart success in 2019. She was ranked as the fifth greatest singer of all time by Rolling Stone in 2023 and placed second in VH1's list of the 100 Greatest Women in Music. She holds the record for the most Billboard Hot 100 number-one singles by a solo artist (19), a female songwriter (18), and a female producer (15). Carey is the highest-certified female artist in the United States and 10th overall, with 74 million certified album units.  Carey has won 5 Grammy Awards, 19 World Music Awards, 10 American Music Awards, 15 Billboard Music Awards and eight Guinness World Records.

Early life 
Mariah Carey was born on March 27, 1969, in Huntington, New York. Her name is derived from the song "They Call the Wind Maria", originally from the 1951 Broadway musical Paint Your Wagon. She is the youngest of three children born to Patricia (née Hickey), a former opera singer and vocal coach of Irish descent, and Alfred Roy Carey, an aeronautical engineer of African-American and black Venezuelan-American lineage. The last name Carey was adopted by her Venezuelan grandfather, Francisco Núñez, after he emigrated to New York. Patricia's family disowned her for marrying a black man. Racial tensions prevented the Carey family from integrating into their community. While they lived in Huntington their neighbors poisoned the family dog and set fire to their car. After her parents' divorce, Carey had little contact with her father, and her mother worked several jobs to support the family. Carey spent much of her time at home alone and began singing at age three, often imitating her mother's take on Verdi's opera Rigoletto in Italian. Her older sister Alison moved in with their father while Mariah and her elder brother Morgan lived with their mother.

During her years in elementary school, she excelled in the arts, such as music and literature. Carey began writing poetry and lyrics while attending Harborfields High School in Greenlawn, New York, where she graduated in 1987. Carey began vocal training under the tutelage of her mother. Though she was a classically trained opera singer, Patricia Carey never pressured her daughter to pursue a career in classical opera. Mariah Carey recalled that she had "never been a pushy mom. She never said, 'Give it more of an operatic feel.' I respect opera like crazy, but it didn't influence me." In high school, Mariah Carey was often absent because of her work as a demo singer. This led to her classmates giving her the nickname Mirage. Working in the Long Island music scene gave her opportunities to work with musicians such as Gavin Christopher and Ben Margulies, with whom she co-wrote material for her demo tape. After moving to New York City, she worked part-time jobs to pay the rent and completed 500 hours of beauty school. Carey moved into a one-bedroom apartment in Manhattan with four female students as roommates. She landed a gig singing backup for freestyle singer Brenda K. Starr.

Career

1988–1992: Career beginnings, Mariah Carey and Emotions 

In December 1988, Carey accompanied Starr to a music executive's party, where she handed her demo tape to the head of Columbia Records, Tommy Mottola. After listening to the tape during the ride home, he immediately requested the driver turn around. Carey had already left the event, and in what has been described as a modern-day Cinderella story, he spent two weeks looking for her. Another record label expressed interest and a bidding war ensued. Mottola signed Carey to Columbia and enlisted producers Ric Wake, Narada Michael Walden, and Rhett Lawrence for her first album. Columbia marketed Carey as the main female artist on their roster, competing with Arista's Whitney Houston and Madonna of Sire Records. On June 5, 1990, Carey made her first public appearance at the 1990 NBA Finals, singing "America the Beautiful". The highlight was the piercing whistle note toward the song's conclusion, sparking CBS Sports anchor Pat O'Brien to declare, "The palace now has a queen."

Columbia spent upwards of $1 million promoting Carey's debut studio album, Mariah Carey. After a slow start, the album eventually topped the Billboard 200 for eleven consecutive weeks, after Carey's exposure at the 33rd Annual Grammy Awards, where she won the award for Best New Artist, and Best Female Pop Vocal Performance for her single "Vision of Love." The album's singles "Vision of Love", "Love Takes Time", "Someday", and "I Don't Wanna Cry" all topped the US Billboard Hot 100. Mariah Carey was the best-selling album in the United States in 1991, and achieved worldwide sales of 15 million copies.

The following year Carey co-wrote, co-produced and recorded her second studio effort, Emotions. Described by Carey as an homage to Motown soul music, Carey employed the help of Walter Afanasieff, who only had a small role on her debut, as well as Robert Clivillés and David Cole, from the dance group C+C Music Factory. Carey's relationship with Margulies deteriorated over a songwriting royalties dispute. After he filed a lawsuit against Columbia's parent company, Sony, the songwriting duo parted ways. Emotions was released on September 17, 1991. The title track, the album's lead single, became Carey's fifth chart topper on the Billboard Hot 100, making her the first artist whose first five singles reached the chart's summit. Though critics praised the album's content and described it as a more mature effort, the album was criticized as calculated and lacking originality. While the album managed sales of eight million copies globally, Emotions failed to reach the commercial and critical heights of its predecessor.

Carey did not embark on a world tour to promote the album. Although she attributed this to stage fright and the vocally challenging nature of her material, speculation grew that Carey was a "studio worm" and that she was incapable of producing the perfect pitch and 5-octave vocal range for which she was known. In hopes of ending any speculation of her being a manufactured artist, Carey booked an appearance on MTV Unplugged. The show presented artists "unplugged" or in a stripped setting and devoid of studio equipment. Days prior to the show's taping, Carey and Afanasieff chose to add a cover of the Jackson 5's 1970 song "I'll Be There" to the set-list. On March 16, 1992, Carey played and recorded an intimate seven-song show at Kaufman Astoria Studios in Queens, New York. The acclaimed revue was aired more than three times as often as the average episode, and critics heralding it as a "vocal Tour de force". Carey's live version of "I'll Be There" became her sixth number-one single on the Billboard Hot 100 chart. Sony capitalized on its success and released it as an EP. It earned a triple-Platinum certification by the Recording Industry Association of America (RIAA), and earned Gold and Platinum certifications in several European markets.

1993–1996: Music Box, Merry Christmas, and Daydream 
After Emotions failed to achieve the commercial heights of her debut album, Carey's subsequent release was to be marketed as adult contemporary and pop-friendly. Music Box was produced by Carey and Afanasieff, and began a songwriting partnership that would extend until 1997's Butterfly. The album was released on August 31, 1993, to mixed reviews from music critics. Carey's songwriting was derided as clichéd and her vocal performances were described as less emotive and lazier in their delivery. In his review of the album, AllMusic's Ron Wynn concluded: "sometimes excessive spirit is preferable to an absence of passion." In promotion of the album, Carey embarked on her debut tour, a six-date concert series, the Music Box Tour. Music Boxs second single, "Hero", became Carey's eighth chart-topper in the United States and has been recognized as her signature song. Her cover of Badfinger's "Without You" was a commercial breakthrough in Europe, becoming her first number-one single in Germany, Sweden and the United Kingdom. Music Box remains Carey's best-seller and one of the best-selling albums of all time, with worldwide sales of over 28 million copies.

In mid-1994, Carey recorded and released a duet with Luther Vandross; a cover of Lionel Richie and Diana Ross's "Endless Love". Merry Christmas, released on November 1, 1994, became the best-selling Christmas album of all time, with global sales of over 15 million copies. The lead single, "All I Want for Christmas Is You", became a holiday standard and continues to surge in popularity each holiday season. By October 2017, it had become the 11th-bestselling single in modern music. In 2019, 25 years after the song's release, it finally peaked at number-one on the Billboard Hot 100 for the first time, and it continued to do so every December since, becoming the first song in history to hold the top position in more than two different chart years, as well as the longest-running holiday number-one song (eight weeks). Additionally, it is the longest running number-one song on the Billboard Holiday 100, spending 44 cumulative weeks, of the chart's 49 total weeks since the list launched in 2011.

Carey's fifth studio album, Daydream, found her consolidating creative control over her career, leading to tensions with Columbia. The album featured a departure from her allegiance to pop and gravitated heavily towards R&B and hip hop. Critically, the album was described as Carey's best to date. The New York Times named it one of 1995's best albums and concluded: "[the album] brings R&B candy-making to a new peak of textural refinement ... Carey's songwriting has taken a leap forward and become more relaxed, sexier and less reliant on thudding clichés." The album's lead single, "Fantasy", became the first single by a female artist to debut at number one on the Billboard Hot 100, and the second single, "One Sweet Day", a collaboration with R&B group Boyz II Men, remained atop the Billboard Hot 100 for a record-breaking 16 consecutive weeks, becoming, at the time, the longest-running number-one song in the history of the charts.

Daydream became Carey's biggest-selling album in the United States, and her second album to be certified Diamond by the RIAA, after Music Box. The album continued Carey's dominance in Asian music markets and sold in excess of 2.2 million copies in Japan alone and over 20 million copies globally. Daydream and its singles were nominated in six categories at the 38th Grammy Awards. Though considered a favorite to win the top awards of the evening, Carey was shut out, prompting her to comment "What can you do? I will never be disappointed again." In early 1996, she embarked on her first international string of concerts, the Daydream World Tour. Its seven dates spanned three in Japan and four throughout Europe. Forbes named Carey the top-earning female musician of 1996, collecting an estimated $32 million.

During the recording of Daydream, Carey also worked on the alternative rock album Someone's Ugly Daughter by the band Chick, contributing writing, production, vocals and art direction. As Columbia Records refused to release the album with her lead vocals, Carey's friend Clarissa Dane was brought in to become the face of Chick, and her vocals were layered on top of Carey's, masking her voice. Carey also directed the music video for the Chick song "Malibu". According to Carey, "I was playing with the style of the breezy-grunge, punk-light white female singers who were popular at the time ... I totally looked forward to doing my alter-ego band sessions after Daydream each night." Her contributions were secret until the release of her 2020 memoir The Meaning of Mariah Carey.

1997–2000: New image and independence, Butterfly, and Rainbow 
Carey's subsequent musical releases followed the trend that began with Daydream. Her music began relying less on pop and adult contemporary-tinged balladry and instead incorporating heavy elements of hip-hop and R&B. On Butterfly, Carey collaborated with a bevy of producers other than Afanasieff, such as Sean Combs, Q-Tip, Missy Elliott and Jean Claude Oliver and Samuel Barnes from Trackmasters. In mid-1997, after four years of marriage, Carey and Mottola separated. Carey described Mottola as increasingly controlling, and viewed her newfound independence as a new lease on life. In the booklet of her twelfth studio album, Memoirs of an Imperfect Angel (2009), Carey wrote that she considers Butterfly her magnum opus and a turning point in both her life and career. Butterfly introduced a more subdued style of singing, with critics noting Carey's incorporation of breathy vocals. Some viewed her lack of propensity to use her upper range as a sign of maturity, while others questioned whether it forebode waning vocal prowess. The music video for the album's lead single, "Honey", her first since separating from Mottola, introduced a more overtly sexual image. Butterfly became Carey's best-reviewed album, with attention placed on the album's exploration of more mature lyrical themes. In their review of the album, Rolling Stone wrote "[It's] not as if Carey has totally dispensed with her old saccharine, Houston-style balladry ... but the predominant mood of 'Butterfly' is one of coolly erotic reverie." AllMusic editor Stephen Thomas Erlewine described Carey's vocals as "sultrier and more controlled than ever," and felt the album "illustrates that Carey continues to improve and refine her music, which makes her a rarity among her '90s peers.'" Though a commercial success, the album failed to reach the commercial heights of her previous albums, Music Box and Daydream.

After concluding her Butterfly World Tour, Carey partook in the VH1 Divas benefit concert on April 14, 1998, where she sang alongside Aretha Franklin, Celine Dion, Shania Twain, Gloria Estefan, and Carole King. Carey began conceptualizing a film project All That Glitters, later re-titled to simply Glitter (2001), and wrote songs for other projects, such as Men in Black (1997) and How the Grinch Stole Christmas (2000). After Glitter fell into developmental hell, Carey postponed the project, and began writing material for a new album. Sony Music executives insisted she prepare a greatest hits collection in time for the holiday season. The album, titled #1's (1998), featured a cover of Brenda K. Starr's "I Still Believe" and a duet with Whitney Houston, "When You Believe", which was included on the soundtrack for The Prince of Egypt (1998). #1's became a phenomenon in Japan, selling over one million copies in its opening week, making Carey the only international artist to accomplish this feat. It sold over 3.25 million copies in Japan in its first three months on sale, and holds the record as the best-selling album by a non-Asian artist.

With only one album left to fulfill her contract with Sony, and with a burning desire to separate herself professionally from the record label her ex-husband still headed, Carey completed the album in three months in mid-1999. Titled Rainbow, the album found Carey exploring with producers whom she had not worked with before. Rainbow became Carey's first album to not feature a collaboration with her longtime writing partner, Walter Afanasieff; instead she chose to work with David Foster and Diane Warren. The album's lead single, "Heartbreaker", featured guest vocals from rapper Jay-Z and a remix produced by DJ Clue?. Rainbow was released on November 2, 1999, to the highest first week sales of her career at the time, however debuting at number two on the Billboard 200. Carey's tense relationship with Columbia grew increasingly fractious; she began posting messages on her website, sharing inside information with fans on the dispute, as well as instructing them to request "Can't Take That Away (Mariah's Theme)" on radio stations. Ultimately, the song was only given a very limited and low-promotion release. Critical reception of Rainbow was generally positive, with the general consensus finding: "what began on Butterfly as a departure ends up on Rainbow a progression – perhaps the first compelling proof of Carey's true colors as an artist." Though a commercial success, Rainbow became Carey's lowest selling album at that point in her career.

2001–2004: Personal and professional setbacks, Glitter and Charmbracelet 
Carey received Billboards Artist of the Decade Award and the World Music Award for Best-Selling Pop Female Artist of the Millennium, and parted from Columbia Records. She signed an unprecedented $100 million five-album recording contract with Virgin Records (EMI Records) in April 2001. Glitter was a musical departure, recreating a 1980s post-disco era to accompany the film, set in 1983. Carey was given full conceptual and creative control over the project. She said that Columbia had regarded her as a commodity, with her separation from Mottola exacerbating her relations with label executives. Carey's three-year relationship with Latin singer Luis Miguel ended.

In July 2001, Carey suffered a physical and emotional breakdown. She began posting disturbing messages on her website, and behaved erratically in live promotional outings. On July 19, she made a surprise appearance on the MTV program Total Request Live (TRL). As the show's host Carson Daly began taping following a commercial break, Carey came out pushing an ice cream cart while wearing a large men's shirt, and began a striptease in which she revealed a tight ensemble. Days later, she posted irregular voice notes on her website: "I'm trying to understand things in life right now and so I really don't feel that I should be doing music right now. What I'd like to do is just a take a little break or at least get one night of sleep without someone popping up about a video. All I really want is [to] just be me and that's what I should have done in the first place ... I don't say this much but guess what, I don't take care of myself." Following the quick removal of the messages, Berger commented that Carey had been "obviously exhausted and not thinking clearly" when she posted the letters.

On July 26, Carey was hospitalized due to exhaustion and a "physical and emotional breakdown". She was admitted to a hospital in Connecticut and remained under doctor's care for two weeks, followed by an extended absence from the public. Virgin Records and 20th Century Fox delayed the release of Glitter and its soundtrack. Critics panned Glitter and its soundtrack; both were unsuccessful commercially. The soundtrack became Carey's lowest-selling album to that point. The St. Louis Post-Dispatch dismissed it as "an absolute mess that'll go down as an annoying blemish on [her] career." She attributed the poor performance to her state of mind, its postponement and the soundtrack having been released on September 11.

Carey's $80 million record deal with Virgin Records was bought out for $28 million. She flew to Capri, Italy, for five months, where she wrote material for a new album. She described her time at Virgin "a complete and total stress-fest ... I made a total snap decision which was based on money and I never make decisions based on money. I learned a big lesson from that." She signed a contract with Island Records, valued at more than $24 million, and launched the record label MonarC. Carey's father, Alfred Roy, with whom she had had little contact since childhood, died of cancer that year. In 2002, Carey was cast in the independent film WiseGirls alongside Mira Sorvino and Melora Walters, who co-starred as waitresses at a mobster-operated restaurant. It premiered at the Sundance Film Festival, and received negative reviews, though Carey's performance was praised; Roger Friedman of Fox News described her as "a Thelma Ritter for the new millennium", and wrote, "Her line delivery is sharp and she manages to get the right laughs." Carey performed the American national anthem at the Super Bowl XXXVI at the Louisiana Superdome in New Orleans, Louisiana.

In December 2002, Carey released her ninth studio album, Charmbracelet, which she said marked "a new lease on life" for her. Sales of Charmbracelet were moderate and the quality of Carey's vocals came under criticism. Joan Anderson from The Boston Globe declared the album "the worst of her career, and revealed a voice [that is] no longer capable of either gravity-defying gymnastics or soft coos", while AllMusic editor Stephen Thomas Erlewine wrote, "Mariah's voice is shot, sounding in tatters throughout the record. She can no longer coo or softly croon nor can she perform her trademark gravity-defying vocal runs." To support the album, Carey embarked on the Charmbracelet World Tour, spanning North America and East Asia over three months. The United States shows were booked in theaters. She described the show as "much more intimate so you'll feel like you had an experience. You experience a night with me." While smaller venues were booked throughout the tour's stateside leg, Carey performed in stadiums in Asia and Europe, playing for a crowd of over 35,000 in Manila, 50,000 in Malaysia, and to over 70,000 people in China. In the United Kingdom, it was her first tour to feature shows outside London, booking arena stops in Glasgow, Birmingham and Manchester. The tour garnered generally positive reviews, with many praising the production and the quality of Carey's vocals.

2005–2007: Resurgence with The Emancipation of Mimi 

Carey's tenth studio album, The Emancipation of Mimi, was produced with the Neptunes, Kanye West and Carey's longtime collaborator, Jermaine Dupri. She described the album as "very much like a party record ... the process of putting on makeup and getting ready to go out ... I wanted to make a record that was reflective of that." The Emancipation of Mimi topped the charts in the United States, becoming Carey's fifth number-one album and first since Butterfly (1997), and was warmly accepted by critics. Caroline Sullivan of The Guardian defined it as "cool, focused and urban [... some of] the first Mariah Carey tunes in years which I wouldn't have to be paid to listen to again," while USA Todays Elysa Gardner wrote, "The [songs] truly reflect the renewed confidence of a songbird who has taken her shots and kept on flying." The album's second single, "We Belong Together", became a "career re-defining" song for Carey, after a relatively unsuccessful period and a point when many critics had considered her career over. Music critics heralded the song as her "return to form," as well as the "return of The Voice," while many felt it would revive "faith" in Carey's potential as a balladeer. "We Belong Together" broke several records in the United States and became Carey's sixteenth chart topper on the Billboard Hot 100. After staying at number one for fourteen non-consecutive weeks, the song became the second longest running number one song in US chart history, behind Carey's 1996 collaboration with Boyz II Men, "One Sweet Day". Billboard listed it as the "song of the decade" and the ninth most popular song of all time. The song broke several airplay records, and according to Nielsen BDS, and gathered both the largest one-day and one-week audiences in history.

During the week of September 25, 2005, Carey set another record, becoming the first female to occupy the first two spots atop the Hot 100, as "We Belong Together" remained at number one, and her next single, "Shake It Off", moved into the number two spot (Ashanti had topped the chart in 2002 while being a "featured" singer on the number two single). On the Billboard Hot 100 Year-end Chart of 2005, the song was declared the number one song, a career first for Carey. Billboard listed "We Belong Together" ninth on The Billboard Hot 100 All-Time Top Songs and was declared the most popular song of the 2000s decade by Billboard. The album was re-released as The Ultra Platinum Edition.

The Emancipation of Mimi earned ten Grammy Award nominations: eight in 2006 for the original release (the most received by Carey in a single year), and two in 2007 for the Ultra Platinum Edition (from which "Don't Forget About Us" became her seventeenth number-one hit). Carey won Best Contemporary R&B Album and Best Female R&B Vocal Performance and Best R&B Song for "We Belong Together". The Emancipation of Mimi was the best-selling album in the United States in 2005, with nearly five million units sold. It was the first album by a solo female artist to become the year's best-selling album since Alanis Morissette's Jagged Little Pill in 1996. At the end of 2005, the IFPI reported that The Emancipation of Mimi had sold more than 7.7 million copies globally, and was the second-best-selling album of the year after Coldplay's X&Y. To date, The Emancipation of Mimi has sold over 12 million copies worldwide. In support of the album, Carey embarked on her first headlining tour in three years, named The Adventures of Mimi after a "Carey-centric fan's" music diary. The tour spanned 40 dates, with 32 in the United States and Canada, two in Africa, and six in Japan. It received warm reception from music critics and concert goers, many of which celebrated the quality of Carey's vocals.

2008–2009: E=MC², Memoirs of an Imperfect Angel, and Precious 
In early 2007, Carey began to work on her eleventh studio album, E=MC², in a private villa in Anguilla. Although E=MC² was well received by most critics, some of them criticized it for being very similar to the formula used on The Emancipation of Mimi. Two weeks before the album's release, "Touch My Body", the record's lead single, reached the top position on the Billboard Hot 100, becoming Carey's eighteenth number one and making her the solo artist with the most number one singles in United States history, pushing her past Elvis Presley into second place according to the magazine's revised methodology. Carey is second only to The Beatles, who have twenty number-one singles. Additionally, it gave Carey her 79th week atop the Hot 100, tying her with Presley as the artist with the most weeks at number one in the Billboard chart history."

E=MC² debuted at number one on the Billboard 200 with 463,000 copies sold, the biggest opening week sales of her career. In 2008, Carey also played an aspiring singer named Krystal in Tennessee and had a cameo appearance in Adam Sandler's film You Don't Mess with the Zohan, playing herself. Since the album's release, Carey had planned to embark on an extensive tour in support of E=MC². However the tour was suddenly cancelled in early December 2008. Carey later stated that she had been pregnant during that time period, and suffered a miscarriage, hence she cancelled the tour. On January 20, 2009, Carey performed "Hero" at the Neighborhood Inaugural Ball after Barack Obama was sworn as the first African-American president of the United States. On July 7, 2009, Carey – alongside Trey Lorenz – performed her version of The Jackson 5 song "I'll Be There" at the memorial service for Michael Jackson.

In 2009, she appeared as a social worker in Precious, the movie adaptation of the 1996 novel Push by Sapphire. The film garnered mostly positive reviews from critics, also for Carey's performance. Variety described her acting as "pitch-perfect." In January 2010, Carey won the Breakthrough Actress Performance Award for her role in Precious at the Palm Springs International Film Festival. On September 25, 2009, Carey's twelfth studio album, Memoirs of an Imperfect Angel, was released. Reception for the album was mostly mixed; Stephen Thomas Erlewine of AllMusic called it "her most interesting album in a decade," while Jon Caramanica from The New York Times criticized Carey's vocal performances, decrying her overuse of her softer vocal registers at the expense of her more powerful lower and upper registers. Commercially, the album debuted at number three on the Billboard 200, and became the lowest-selling studio album of her career. "Obsessed" served as the lead single, and debuted at number eleven in the US before peaked at number seven, and became Carey's 27th top-ten entry within the nation, tying her with Elton John and Janet Jackson for having the fifth most top-tens. Its follow-up single, a cover of Foreigner's "I Want to Know What Love Is", managed to break airplay records in Brazil. The song spent 27 weeks atop the Brasil Hot 100 Airplay, making it the longest running song in the chart's history.

On December 31, 2009, Carey embarked on her seventh concert tour, Angels Advocate Tour, which visited the United States and Canada and ended on September 26, 2010. A planned remix album of Memoirs of an Imperfect Angel, titled Angels Advocate, was slated for a March 30, 2010 release but was eventually cancelled.

2010–2014: Merry Christmas II You and Me. I Am Mariah... The Elusive Chanteuse 
Following the cancellation of Angels Advocate, it was announced that Carey would return to the studio to start work on her thirteenth studio album. It was later revealed that it would be her second Christmas album, and follow-up to Merry Christmas. Longtime collaborators for the project included Jermaine Dupri, Johntá Austin, Bryan-Michael Cox, and Randy Jackson, as well as new collaborators such as Marc Shaiman. The release date for the album, titled Merry Christmas II You, was November 2, 2010; the track list included six new songs as well as a remix of "All I Want for Christmas Is You". Merry Christmas II You debuted at number four on the Billboard 200 with sales of 56,000 copies, becoming Carey's 16th top ten album in the United States. The album debuted at number one on the R&B/Hip-Hop Albums chart, making it only the second Christmas album to top this chart.

In May 2010, Carey dropped out of her planned appearance in For Colored Girls, the film adaptation of the play For Colored Girls Who Have Considered Suicide When the Rainbow Is Enuf, citing medical reasons. In February 2011, Carey announced that she had begun writing new material for her upcoming fourteenth studio album. Carey recorded a duet with Tony Bennett for his Duets II album, titled "When Do The Bells Ring For Me?" In October 2011, Carey announced that she re-recorded "All I Want for Christmas Is You" with Justin Bieber as a duet for his Christmas album, Under the Mistletoe. In November 2011, Carey was included in the remix to the mixtape single "Warning" by Uncle Murda; the remix also features 50 Cent and Young Jeezy. That same month, Carey released a duet with John Legend titled "When Christmas Comes", originally part of Merry Christmas II You.

On March 1, 2012, Carey performed at New York City's Gotham Hall; her first time performing since her pregnancy. She also performed a three-song set at a special fundraiser for US President Barack Obama held in New York's Plaza Hotel. A new song titled "Bring It On Home", which Carey wrote for the event to show her support for Obama's re-election campaign, was also performed. In August 2012, she released a stand-alone single, "Triumphant (Get 'Em)", featuring rappers Rick Ross and Meek Mill and co-written and co-produced by Carey, Jermaine Dupri, and Bryan-Michael Cox. Carey joined the judging panel of the twelfth season of American Idol as Jennifer Lopez's replacement, joining Randy Jackson, Nicki Minaj and Keith Urban. Throughout the show there were on-set disagreements between Minaj and Carey. Three years later, Carey did not make an appearance for its original series finale. Carey appeared in Lee Daniels' 2013 film The Butler, about a White House butler who served eight American presidents over the course of three decades. Carey made guest voice-star as a redneck character on the adult animated series American Dad! on November 24, 2013.

In February 2013, Carey recorded and released a song called "Almost Home", for the soundtrack of the Walt Disney Studios film Oz the Great and Powerful. The video was directed by photographer David LaChapelle. For her 14th album, Carey worked with producers including DJ Clue?, Randy Jackson, Q-Tip, R. Kelly, David Morales, Loris Holland, Stevie J, James Fauntleroy II, Ray Angry, Afanasieff, Dupri, Bryan-Michael Cox, James "Big Jim" Wright, Hit-Boy, The-Dream, Da Brat, and Rodney Jerkins. Carey told Billboard: "It's about making sure I have tons of good music, because at the end of the day that's the most important thing... There are a lot more raw ballads than people might expect...there are also uptempo and signature-type songs that represent [my] different facets as an artist."

The lead single, "Beautiful" featuring singer Miguel, was released on May 6, 2013, and peaked at number 15 on the Hot 100. Carey taped a performance of "Beautiful" along with a medley of her greatest hits on May 15, 2013; the taping aired on the American Idol finale the following day. On October 14, 2013, Carey announced that the album's former title track has been chosen as the second single; it premiered via Facebook on November 11, 2013. During a Q&A session following the song's release, Carey gave an update about the album, stating: "Now I've been inspired to add two more songs, so we're almost there. I can't even express this properly but I feel like this is gonna be my favorite album." Following another song release, "You're Mine (Eternal)", it was announced that The Art of Letting Go would no longer be the title of the album. After the final name was announced, Me. I Am Mariah... The Elusive Chanteuse was released on May 27, 2014.

In October 2014, Carey announced All I Want For Christmas Is You, A Night of Joy & Festivity, an annual residency show at the Beacon Theatre in New York City. The first leg included six shows, running from December 15 to 22, 2014. Carey announced the second leg in October 2015. The second leg ran for 8 shows, from December 8–18, 2015.

2015–2017: Las Vegas residency, television and film projects 
On January 30, 2015, it was announced that Carey had left Universal Music Group's Def Jam Recordings to reunite with L.A. Reid and Sony Music via Epic Records. Carey also announced her new #1 to Infinity residency at The Colosseum at Caesars Palace in Las Vegas the same month. To coincide with the residency, Carey released #1 to Infinity, a greatest hits compilation album containing all of her eighteen Billboard Hot 100 number one singles at the time, along with a new recording, "Infinity", which was released as a single on April 27. In 2015 Carey had her directorial debut for the Hallmark Channel Christmas movie A Christmas Melody, in which she also performed as one of the main characters. Filming for the project took place during October 2015. In December 2015, Carey announced The Sweet Sweet Fantasy Tour which spanned a total of 27-dates beginning in March 2016, marking Carey's first major tour of mainland Europe in 13 years. Four stops included shows in South Africa. The tour grossed $30.3 million.

On March 15, 2016, Carey announced that she was filming Mariah's World, a docu-series for the E! network documenting her Sweet Sweet Fantasy tour and her wedding planning process. Carey told The New York Times, "I thought it would be a good opportunity to kind of, like, show my personality and who I am, even though I feel like my real fans have an idea of who I am... A lot of people have misperceptions about this and that." The series premiered on December 4, 2016. Carey guest starred on the musical drama Empire, as a superstar singer named Kitty and sung the song "Infamous" featuring Jussie Smollett. On December 5, 2016, Carey participated in the VH1 Divas Holiday: Unsilent Night benefit concert, alongside Vanessa Williams, Chaka Khan, Patti LaBelle, and Teyana Taylor. On December 31, 2016, Carey's performance on Dick Clark's New Year's Rockin' Eve in Times Square received worldwide attention after technical difficulties caused Carey's in-ear monitors to malfunction, resulting in what The New York Times referred to as a "performance train wreck." Carey cited her inability to hear the music without in-ear auditory feedback as the cause for the mishap. Carey's representatives and Dick Clark Productions placed blame on each other.

On February 3, 2017, Carey released the single "I Don't" featuring YG. Later that month, she voiced the Mayor of Gotham City in the animated film The Lego Batman Movie. In July 2017, Carey made a cameo in the comedy film Girls Trip, starring Queen Latifah, Jada Pinkett Smith, Regina Hall, and Tiffany Haddish. The same month, Carey embarked on a tour with Lionel Richie, titled, All the Hits Tour. Carey was also featured in the official remix for French Montana's single "Unforgettable", alongside Swae Lee. In October 2017, she released a new soundtrack single, "The Star", for the movie of the same name. Carey also developed an animated Christmas film, titled Mariah Carey's All I Want For Christmas Is You, for which she recorded an original song called "Lil' Snowman." The film was released direct-to-video on November 14, 2017. In the same month, Carey resumed her All I Want for Christmas Is You, a Night of Joy and Festivity concert series, which for the first time visited other countries including England and France. On December 31, 2017, Carey returned to perform on Dick Clark's New Year's Rockin' Eve after the technical difficulties that hindered her previous performance, in what The New York Times described as a "made-for-television act of pop culture redemption".

2018–2019: Caution and Merry Christmas reissue 
In 2018, Carey signed a worldwide deal with Live Nation Entertainment. The first commitment out of the deal was her new Las Vegas residency, The Butterfly Returns, which was launched in July 2018 to critical acclaim. Its first 12 shows in 2018 grossed $3.6 million, with dates later extending into 2019 and 2020. Following the residency, Carey embarked on her Mariah Carey: Live in Concert tour in Asia and returned to Europe with her All I Want for Christmas Is You concert series. In September 2018, Carey announced plans to release her fifteenth studio album later in the year. The project was announced alongside the release of a new song titled "GTFO", which she performed on September 21, 2018, when she headlined the 2018 iHeartRadio Music Festival. The album's lead single, "With You", was released in October and performed for the first time at the American Music Awards of 2018. The single became Carey's highest-charting non-holiday song on the US Adult Contemporary chart since "We Belong Together" in 2005. It was followed by a second single, "A No No". The album, titled Caution, was released on November 16, 2018, and received universal acclaim from critics; it debuted at number five on the Billboard 200. By December 2018, the album had been featured on numerous year-end lists by music critics and publications.

In February 2019, Carey commenced the Caution World Tour in support of the album. Later in 2019, Carey engaged in a series of business and television ventures. On May 29, 2019, the film Always Be My Maybe, inspired by the song "Always Be My Baby", was published on Netflix. On September 18, 2019, Carey released "In the Mix", the theme song for the ABC sitcom Mixed-ish. On November 1, 2019, Carey re-released her holiday album Merry Christmas for its 25th anniversary. The album package included the original album and another disc which include live performances from Carey's 1994 concert at St. John the Divine Church, several tracks from Merry Christmas II You, as well as other stand-alone singles such as "Lil Snowman" and "The Star". On December 5, 2019, it was announced that a mini-documentary titled Mariah Carey Is Christmas!, charting the creation and subsequent cultural legacy of "All I Want for Christmas Is You" was to be produced and broadcast on Amazon Music; it premiered later that month. Peaking at number one on the Billboard Hot 100 for the first time the same year, the song ended up giving Carey her nineteenth chart-topper in the US.

2020–present: The Rarities and The Meaning of Mariah Carey 
In January 2020, it was announced that Carey would be inducted into the Songwriters Hall of Fame during that year's ceremony on June 11, 2020, at the Marriott Marquis Hotel in New York City. Her memoir, The Meaning of Mariah Carey which was co-written with Michaela Angela Davis, was published in September of the same year. It recounts an "improbable and inspiring journey of survival and resilience as she struggles through complex issues of race, identity, class, childhood, and family trauma during her meteoric rise to music superstardom". The memoir became a number one New York Times Best Seller after its first week of release. Carey announced plans to celebrate the 30th anniversary of her debut album through the rest of 2020, in a promotional campaign billed "#MC30". The first release consisted of the live EP The Live Debut – 1990 which was released on July 17, 2020. The digital-only release includes live performances from Carey's debut showcase at New York City's Club Tatou on October 22, 1990.

On October 2, 2020, Carey released a compilation album titled The Rarities, which includes rare and unreleased songs that Carey recorded at various stages of her career. Its lead single, "Save the Day" featuring Lauryn Hill, was released on August 20, and its music video was released on September 13 as part of the airing of the US Open. Four days later, the album's second single—a cover of Irene Cara's "Out Here on My Own"—was released after being recorded by Carey in 2000. At the end of October, Carey was featured on the track "Where I Belong" from Busta Rhymes' album Extinction Level Event 2: The Wrath of God, which was later released as the third single from the album in April 2021.

Carey's 2020 Christmas special, Mariah Carey's Magical Christmas Special, premiered on December 4, 2020, on Apple TV+ along with a soundtrack. The special featured guests, including Ariana Grande, Jennifer Hudson, Snoop Dogg, Misty Copeland, Jermaine Dupri, and Mykal-Michelle Harris. A new version of Carey's 2010 song "Oh Santa!", featuring guest vocals from Grande and Hudson, was released as a single the same day, and peaked at number 76 on the US Billboard Hot 100. One week later, "All I Want for Christmas Is You" topped the UK charts for the first time after spending a record 69 weeks in its top 40 prior to reaching the summit, becoming Carey's third number-one song in the country.

In July 2021, Carey was featured on the track "Somewhat Loved" from Jimmy Jam and Terry Lewis' debut studio album Jam & Lewis: Volume One, which was released as the third single from the album, and reached the top-ten on the US Adult R&B Songs chart. On November 2, 2021, Carey teased a snippet of a new song titled "Fall in Love at Christmas", which features Khalid and Kirk Franklin. The single was released on November 5 and it was performed on her new Christmas special titled Mariah's Christmas: The Magic Continues.

On January 12, 2022, Carey announced a children's picture book titled The Christmas Princess, co-written with Michaela Angela Davis and illustrated by Fuuji Takashi; it was released in November that year. In March, Carey was featured alongside DJ Khaled on the remix of rapper Latto's single "Big Energy", taken from her sophomore album, 777. The remix interpolates Carey's 1995 single "Fantasy". It peaked at number 6 on the ARIA Charts and was certified double Platinum in Australia. It also charted at number 21 on the UK Official Singles Chart and was certified Silver by the British Phonographic Industry (BPI). In April, an online MasterClass course based on singing, in which Carey served as a vocal coach, was released. A re-recorded version of Carey's 1998 single, "The Roof", featuring Brandy Norwood and subtitled "(When I Feel The Need)", was made available exclusively to Masterclass subscribers. Later that month, Number 1's was released on vinyl as a Record Store Day exclusive. In June, Carey performed the remix of "Big Energy" with Latto at the BET Awards 2022; she made a surprise appearance during the latter's set.

On September 16, 2022, an expanded version of Butterfly was released for the 25th anniversary of the album. In December 2022, Carey performed a pair of shows at two venues: Scotiabank Arena in Toronto on December 9 and December 11, 2022, and Madison Square Garden in New York City on December 13 and December 16, 2022. On December 20, 2022, a television special adapted from her shows in New York, titled Mariah Carey: Merry Christmas to All!, aired on CBS and became the most watched program of its night, drawing in a total of 3.8 million viewers and a 0.4 demo rating.

Carey's 2009 track "It's a Wrap" experienced a revival on TikTok in February 2023. This prompted Her to release a EP for the track, which featured the main mix, a new sped-up version, a Mary J. Blige remix, and a previously-unreleased edit version.

Artistry

Influences 
Carey has said that from childhood she has been influenced by Billie Holiday, Sarah Vaughan as well as R&B and soul musicians including Al Green, Stevie Wonder, Gladys Knight, and Aretha Franklin. Her music contains strong influences of gospel music, and she credits the Clark Sisters, Shirley Caesar, and Edwin Hawkins as the most influential in her early years. When Carey incorporated hip hop into her sound, speculation arose that she was making an attempt to take advantage of the genre's popularity, but she told Newsweek, "People just don't understand. I grew up with this music." She has expressed appreciation for rappers such as the Sugarhill Gang, Eric B. & Rakim, the Wu-Tang Clan, The Notorious B.I.G. and Mobb Deep, with whom she collaborated on the single "The Roof (Back in Time)" (1998). Carey was heavily influenced by Minnie Riperton, and began experimenting with the whistle register due to her original practice of the range.

During Carey's career, her vocal and musical style, along with her level of success, has been compared to Whitney Houston, whom she has also cited as an influence, and Celine Dion. Carey and her peers, according to Garry Mulholland, are "the princesses of wails... virtuoso vocalists who blend chart-oriented pop with mature MOR torch song." Author and writer Lucy O'Brien attributed the comeback of Barbra Streisand's "old-fashioned showgirl" to Carey and Dion, and described them and Houston as "groomed, airbrushed and overblown to perfection." Carey's musical transition and use of more revealing clothing during the late 1990s were, in part, initiated to distance herself from this image, and she subsequently said that most of her early work was "schmaltzy MOR." Some have noted that unlike Houston and Dion, Carey writes and produces her own music.

Musical style 

Love is the subject of the majority of Carey's lyrics, although she has written about themes such as loss, sex, race, abuse and spirituality. She has said that much of her work is partly autobiographical, but Time magazine's Christopher John Farley wrote: "If only Mariah Carey's music had the drama of her life. Her songs are often sugary and artificial—NutraSweet soul. But her life has passion and conflict," applying it to the first stages of her career. He commented that as her albums progressed, so too her songwriting and music blossomed into more mature and meaningful material. Jim Faber of the New York Daily News, made similar comments, "For Carey, vocalizing is all about the performance, not the emotions that inspired it. Singing, to her, represents a physical challenge, not an emotional unburdening."

While reviewing Music Box, Stephen Holden from Rolling Stone commented that Carey sang with "sustained passion," while Arion Berger of Entertainment Weekly wrote that during some vocal moments, Carey becomes "too overwhelmed to put her passion into words." In 2001, The Village Voice wrote about Carey's "centerless ballads, "Carey's Strawberry Shortcake soul still provides the template with which teen-pop cuties draw curlicues around those centerless [Diane] Warren ballads [.....] it's largely because of [Blige] that the new R&B demands a greater range of emotional expression, smarter poetry, more from-the-gut testifying, and less [sic] unnecessary notes than the squeaky-clean and just plain squeaky Mariah era. Nowadays it's the Christina Aguileras and Jessica Simpsons who awkwardly oversing, while the women with roof-raising lung power keep it in check when tune or lyric demands."

Carey's output makes use of electronic instruments such as drum machines, keyboards and synthesizers. Many of her songs contain piano-driven melodies, as she was given piano lessons when she was six years old. Carey said that she cannot read sheet music and prefers to collaborate with a pianist when composing her material, but feels that it is easier to experiment with faster and less-conventional melodies and chord progressions using this technique. While Carey learned to play the piano at a young age, and incorporates several ranges of production and instrumentation into her music, she has maintained that her voice has always been her most important asset: "My voice is my instrument; it always has been."

Carey began commissioning remixes of her material early in her career and helped to spearhead the practice of recording entirely new vocals for remixes. Disc jockey David Morales has collaborated with Carey on several occasions, starting with "Dreamlover" (1993), which popularized the tradition of remixing R&B songs into house records, and which Slant magazine named one of the greatest dance songs of all time. From "Fantasy" (1995) onward, Carey enlisted both hip-hop and house producers to re-structure her album compositions. Entertainment Weekly included two remixes of "Fantasy" on a list of Carey's greatest recordings compiled in 2005: a National Dance Music Award-winning remix produced by Morales, and a Sean Combs production featuring rapper Ol' Dirty Bastard. The latter has been credited with popularizing the R&B/hip-hop collaboration trend that has continued into the 2000s, through artists such as Ashanti and Beyoncé. Combs said that Carey "knows the importance of mixes, so you feel like you're with an artist who appreciates your work—an artist who wants to come up with something with you."

In an article in The New York Times, writer David Browne discusses how the once-ubiquitous melisma pop style was heavily popularized by singers such as Carey. Browne commented, "beginning [in 1990], melisma overtook pop in a way it hadn't before. Mariah Carey's debut hit from 1990, "Vision of Love", [set] the bar insanely high for notes stretched louder, longer and knottier than most pop fans had ever heard." Browne further added "A subsequent generation of singers, including Ms. Aguilera, Jennifer Hudson and Beyoncé, built their careers around melisma. (Men like Brian McKnight and Tyrese also indulged in it, but women tended to dominate the form.)"

Voice and timbre 

Carey possesses a five-octave vocal range, and has the ability to reach notes beyond the seventh octave. Referred to as the "Songbird Supreme" by the Guinness World Records, she was ranked first in a 2003 MTV and Blender magazine countdown of the 22 Greatest Voices in Music, as voted by a combination of critics and readers in an online poll. Carey said of the poll: "What it really means is voice of the MTV generation. Of course, it's an enormous compliment, but I don't feel that way about myself." She also placed second in Cove magazine's list of "The 100 Outstanding Pop Vocalists."

Regarding her type of voice Carey has said she is an contralto, although several critics have described her as a coloratura light lyric soprano. Carey claims that she has had nodules on her vocal cords since childhood, due to which she can sing in a higher register than others. However, tiredness and sleep deprivation can affect her vocals due to the nodules, and Carey explained that she went through a lot of practice to maintain a balance during singing. Carey stated in a 2021 interview with the Daily Express that with her voice, it's all about "timing, vocal rest and sleep". Jon Pareles of The New York Times described Carey's lower register as a "rich, husky alto" that extends to "dog-whistle high notes." Additionally, towards the late 1990s, Carey began incorporating breathy vocals into her material. Tim Levell from BBC News described her vocals as "sultry close-to-the-mic breathiness," while USA Todays Elysa Gardner wrote "it's impossible to deny the impact her vocal style, a florid blend of breathy riffing and resonant belting, has had on today's young pop and R&B stars."

Sasha Frere-Jones of The New Yorker adds her timbre possesses various colors, stating, "Carey's sound changes with nearly every line, mutating from a steely tone to a vibrating growl and then to a humid, breathy coo. Her wide vocal range allows Carey to take melodies from alto bottom notes to coloratura soprano upper register." Carey also possesses a "whistle register." In an interview, Ron Givens of Entertainment Weekly described it this way, "first, a rippling, soulful ooh comes rolling effortlessly from her throat: alto. Then, after a quick breath, she goes for the stratosphere, with a sound that nearly changes the barometric pressure in the room. In one brief swoop, she seems to squeal and roar at the same time." Her sense of pitch is admired and Jon Pareles adds "she can linger over sensual turns, growl with playful confidence, syncopate like a scat singer... with startlingly exact pitch."

Stage performances and videos 

Despite being called a "show stopper" and "the 1990s pop phenomenon", Carey suffered from stage fright in her early years in the music industry. One of her earliest performances was at MTV Unplugged, which received positive reception as Carey silenced critics saying her vocals were studio-made. Carey's "The Star-Spangled Banner" rendition at the Super Bowl XXXVI was called "stunning" by Billboard. She also performed "America the Beautiful" at the 1990 NBA Finals in which Rolling Stone writer, Brittany Spanos, stated the players were struck "with awe by the incredible talent of a burgeoning young star". The singer received the only standing ovation of the night at the 48th Annual Grammy Awards, after performing the medley of "We Belong Together and "Fly Like a Bird".

Carey is known for being very static during her live performances; some reviewers credited her stage fright and lack of confidence as the reasoning, while others pointed out that her performances focus on her vocals and the quality of her songs. Her onstage hand gesticulations have usually been mimicked, as the singer has a tendency for "using her hands to point, flutter and sweep through the air as she deftly crests each run". When reviewing Carey's 2014 concert, Michael Lallo wrote that "If you're Mariah, you ... stroke your hair a lot. When a high note is on the horizon, you brace yourself by touching your ear and adopting a pained expression, provoking the crowd into losing its collective mind."

The music video for "Fantasy" was the first that Carey directed entirely on her own. Carey had been open about the fact that she had not been happy with some of her previous music videos, and has subsequently been noted for self-directing and co-producing her subsequent videography. The song "Honey" pushed Carey further towards hip hop and R&B than before. The music video gained further attention, as Carey, for the first time in her career, was provocatively dressed, giving viewers a "taste of the freer Mariah." Billboard ranked Carey 73rd on its list of "The 100 Greatest Music Video Artists of All Time" in 2020, stating that "over three decades, [Carey] has gone from breezy girl next door, flaunting a denim collection as wide as her vocal range, to secret agent, runaway bride and even her own stalker in a collection of music videos that play like mini-dramas". The music video for "The Roof" was ranked 18th on Slant Magazine's "100 Greatest Music Videos. The music video for "Heartbreaker" remains one of the most expensive ever made, costing over $2.5 million. In 2021, Carey was honoured at the African American Film Critics Association with a Special Achievement Innovator Award for her "visual storytelling in her music videos and specials".

Image 

Carey has been called a pop icon and has been labeled a "diva" for her stardom and persona. She said, "I have had diva moments, and then people can't handle it. I guess it's a little intense, because I come from a true diva: My mother is an opera singer. And that's a real diva, you know–Juilliard diva. And I mean it as a compliment, or I wouldn't be the person I am without experiencing that."

Carey's fanbase is known as the "Lambily", a portmanteau of "lamb" and "family". In 2008, Carey was named one of Times 100 most influential artists and entertainers in the world. NOW writer Kevin Hegge agreed that "Carey’s influence is indisputable". Carey was a "tabloid fixture in the early 2000's" and her public breakdown during the promotion of her 2001 film, Glitter, became the "stuff of tabloid legend" according to Justin Curto, writer for Vulture. Hegge also went on to say that in recent years, the public has dwelled more on Carey's celebrity drama stating that "Carey's every misstep and quirk has been scrutinized to a viral extent ... the public loves nothing more than to dismiss her as a dim-witted celebrity prop". After joining American Idol as a judge for the twelfth season, Carey became one of the highest paid American television stars.

She has also been described as a sex symbol. The singer mentions Marilyn Monroe as one of her biggest idols and her "beauty icon", and she referenced Monroe in some of her music videos, such as "I Still Believe" or "Don't Forget About Us". As the biggest pop star in music by the mid-1990s, Carey's "first years as a pop star were extraordinarily fruitful but restrictive". In the late 1990s, after separating from Mottola, Carey adopted a more provocative and less conservative image than had been previously seen and began wearing more revealing clothes. Her album Butterfly has been credited for revamping Carey's image as a pop star where she began to embrace hip hop and R&B themes and fully come into her own self, resulting in butterflies becoming a metaphorical symbol of her impact and legacy upon pop and R&B music. Emilia Petrarca of W stated that "Carey is uber-cautious about cultivating her public image" but that when it comes to style, she is "more do than don’t".

Fashion has also been a part of Carey's image. She was cited a fashion icon by Insider writer Susanna Heller who added that "her decadent closet spans multiple rooms and is full of designer clothing, lingerie, shoes, and accessories". CR Fashion Book writer Shepherd also stated that while her "sartorial aesthetic has shifted here and there ..., the music icon largely favors sexy, skin-baring, and often bedazzled looks. During her tours, she has frequently worn Jimmy Choo and Christian Louboutin high-end stiletto footwear, as well as leotards, corsets, and fishnet tights. Laura Antonia Jordan of Grazia called Carey fashion "royalty" and stated that in the 1990s, her go-to looks were "super-tight silhouettes, cropped tops, thigh-grazing hemlines and dangerously high slits."

Several media outlets have called Carey the "Queen of Shade". When asked about American singer Jennifer Lopez in a German TV interview, Carey's response was, "I don't know her". The clip became a viral internet meme and has been brought up in many other interviews with both of the singers. After the release of "Obsessed", critics heavily compared its lyrics to Eminem who had negatively referenced her several times in songs, and suggested Carey alluded to him and his 'obsession' with her. "Obsessed" never mentions the rapper's name, although reviewers felt it to be very obvious. Additionally, Carey played a role that resembled the rapper in the song's accompanying music video.

She is recognized as a gay icon and her song "Hero" is regarded as an anthem among the gay community as it touches upon themes of embracing individuality and overcoming self-doubt. According to Carey herself, a lot of her gay fans admitted to also be growing up listening to her song "Outside" and relating to the feeling of isolation and unfitting. Her diva persona has also given her much admiration from gay fans. Carey was honored by GLAAD in 2016 with the "GLAAD Ally Award" for which she expressed gratitude to her LGBT+ fans. In her speech she thanked the community, "For the unconditional love ... I wish all of you love, peace, [and] harmony".

"All I Want for Christmas Is You", as well as its parent album Merry Christmas, have become such a ubiquitous part of wider popular culture that Carey has been dubbed the "Queen of Christmas". The album is credited as being the greatest selling Christmas album of all time. Both the song and album have been hailed as being "one of the few worthy modern additions to the holiday canon" by publications such as The New Yorker. Speaking to Vogue in 2015 about "All I Want For Christmas Is You", Elvis Duran stated that the song's appeal was based on the fact that it was "a modern song that could actually have been a hit back in the '40s", praising its "timeless, classic quality". The success of the song, in particular, has led Carey to build what Billboard described as a "growing holiday mini-empire".

Legacy 

Carey has been credited for her role in breaking down racial barriers in popular culture and facilitating public discourse surrounding multiracialism during the 1990s. Brittany Luse from Vulture wrote that Carey "rose to fame as public conversations about multiracial identity were expanding in the early '90s', noting that the singer "became something of an avatar for biracial identity, a validating presence for some and a source of both curiosity and discomfort for others". Luse concluded that "Carey's experience of fame could have happened only once; her stardom punched a hole in the sky. Her career matured as current conversations about mixed identity were still forming and while the passing narratives of the past, both brilliant and clumsy, had yet to fade from pop-cultural memory. There was a time when she might have been considered the most famous mixed person of Black and white parentage in America, but now the field's far more crowded (Zendaya, Drake, Barack Obama, Meghan Markle)". In her book Tragic No More: Mixed-Race Women and the Nexus of Sex and Celebrity, Caroline A. Streeter, an associate professor at the University of California, Los Angeles, also described Carey as one of the "ideal figures through which to consider the post–Civil Rights era’s apparent rehabilitation and transformation of the mulatto/a into a biracial subject of representation".

The impact of Carey's artistry has helped popularize rappers as a featured act in pop music through her post-1995 songs. She has been called the "Queen of Remixes" by multiple media sources, with MTV writer, Princess Gabbara, noting that it is "no secret that [Carey] goes to great lengths to deliver a spectacular remix, often re-recording vocals, penning new lyrics, shooting new music videos, and recording different versions to satisfy pop, R&B, hip-hop, and EDM audiences". Speaking to Billboard in 2019 for a profile of Carey's career, David Morales, who first collaborated with Carey on the Def Club Mix of her 1993 single "Dreamlover", commented on Carey's revolutionary role in the popularization of remixes: "Mariah opened up a whole other door, and not many people at that time were capable of that. When other big artists saw what I did with Mariah, they wanted that. She's how I got into the studio with Toni Braxton, Aretha Franklin, Seal and Donna Summer."

Sasha Frere-Jones, editor of The New Yorker commented, "It became standard for R&B/hip-hop stars like Missy Elliott and Beyoncé, to combine melodies with rapped verses. And young white pop stars—including Britney Spears, Jessica Simpson, Christina Aguilera, and 'N Sync—have spent much of the past ten years making pop music that is unmistakably R&B." Moreover, Jones concludes that "[Carey's] idea of pairing a female songbird with the leading male MCs of hip-hop changed R&B and, eventually, all of pop. Although now anyone is free to use this idea, the success of The Emancipation of Mimi suggests that it still belongs to Carey." Judnick Mayard, writer of The Fader, wrote that in regarding of R&B and hip hop collaboration, "The champion of this movement is Mariah Carey." Mayard also expressed that "To this day ODB and Mariah may still be the best and most random hip hop collaboration of all time," citing that due to the record "Fantasy", "R&B and Hip-Hop were the best of step siblings." Kelefa Sanneh of The New York Times wrote, "In the mid-1990s Ms. Carey pioneered a subgenre that some people call the thug-love duet. Nowadays clean-cut pop stars are expected to collaborate with roughneck rappers, but when Ms. Carey teamed up with Ol' Dirty Bastard, of the Wu-Tang Clan, for the 1995 hit remix of 'Fantasy', it was a surprise, and a smash." Vulture magazine writer Craig Jenkins pointed out that some of Ariana Grande's songs reminisced on Carey's work in the late 1990s where she managed to bend and combine hip-hop, pop, and R&B sounds.

Carey's vocal style, as well as her singing ability, have significantly impacted popular and contemporary music. She has been considered one of the greatest vocalists of all time. As music critic G. Brown from The Denver Post wrote, "For better or worse, Mariah Carey's five-octave range and melismatic style have influenced a generation of pop singers." According to Stevie Wonder, "When people talk about the great influential singers, they talk about Aretha, Whitney and Mariah. That's a testament to her talent. Her range is that amazing." Carey's songs have been recorded or performed by a variety of artists, including those of older generations, such as Aretha Franklin, Patti LaBelle, Dolly Parton, Red Hot Chili Peppers, Shania Twain and Michael Ball. Carey has inspired singers and songwriters all over the world. In a review of her Greatest Hits album, Devon Powers of PopMatters writes that "She has influenced countless female vocalists after her. At 32, she is already a living legend—even if she never sings another note." Upon honoring her with the "Icon Award" at their eponymous awards ceremony in 2012, Broadcast Music, Inc. (BMI) described Carey's songwriting as having a "unique and indelible influence on generations of music makers".

According to Rolling Stone, "Her mastery of melisma, the fluttering strings of notes that decorate songs like "Vision of Love", inspired the entire American Idol vocal school, for better or worse, and virtually every other female R&B singer since the Nineties." In 2008, Jody Rosen of Slate wrote of Carey's influence in modern music, calling her the most influential vocal stylist of the last two decades, the person who made rococo melismatic singing. Rosen further exemplified Carey's influence by drawing a parallel with American Idol, which to her, "often played out as a clash of melisma-mad Mariah wannabes. And, today, nearly 20 years after Carey's debut, major labels continue to bet the farm on young stars such as the winner of Britain's X Factor show, Leona Lewis, with her Generation Next gloss on Mariah's big voice and big hair." New York Magazines editor Roger Deckker further commented that "Whitney Houston may have introduced melisma (the vocally acrobatic style of lending a word an extra syllable or twenty) to the charts, but it was Mariah—with her jaw-dropping range—who made it into America's default sound." Deckker also added that "Every time you turn on American Idol, you are watching her children." As Professor Katherine L. Meizel said in her book, The Mediation of Identity Politics in American Idol, "Carey's influence (is) in the emulation of melisma or her singing amongst the wannabe's, it's also her persona, her diva, her stardom which inspires them... a pre-fame conic look." With her ability to do runs, scats, and incredible control using whistle register, Mariah Carey is credited for popularizing this technique in mainstream music.

Achievements 

Throughout her career, Carey has earned numerous awards and honors. She has won five Grammy Awards, nineteen World Music Awards, ten American Music Awards, and fifteen Billboard Music Awards. She is also an inductee of the Songwriters Hall of Fame. As of March 2022, the Recording Industry Association of America (RIAA) lists Carey as the best-selling female albums artist, with shipments of 72 million units in the US. The singer has amassed two diamond certified albums, Music Box and Daydream. Music Box has sold 23 million copies worldwide as of 2002 and remains one of the best-selling albums of all time. In August 2015, Carey was honored with a star on the Hollywood Walk of Fame.

Carey has set and broken numerous Hot 100 records. She has topped the Billboard Hot 100 for 87 weeks, the most for any artist in US chart history. On that same chart, she has accumulated 19 number-one singles, the most for any solo artist (second behind the Beatles) and she is also the only artist to have a number-one song in each year of a decade (1990s decade). In 2020, Carey became the first artist to top the Billboard Hot 100 over four decades (1990s, 2000s, 2010s and 2020s). Carey has also had three songs debut atop the Hot 100 chart with "Fantasy", "One Sweet Day" and "Honey". Carey was also the first female artist to debut at number one in the US with "Fantasy". Her single "One Sweet Day", with Boyz II Men, spent sixteen consecutive weeks at the top of Billboards Hot 100 chart in 1996, setting the record for the most weeks atop the Hot 100 chart until surpassed in 2019 by "Old Town Road". In 2008, Billboard listed "We Belong Together" ninth on The Billboard Hot 100 All-Time Top Songs and second on Top Billboard Hot 100 R&B/Hip-Hop Songs. The song was also declared the most popular song of the 2000s decade by Billboard.

On November 19, 2010, Billboard magazine ranked Carey at number four on their "Top 50 R&B/Hip-Hop Artists of the Past 25 Years" chart. In 2012, Carey was ranked second on VH1's list of the "100 Greatest Women in Music". Billboard magazine ranked her at number five on the Billboard Hot 100 All-Time Top Artists, making Carey the second most successful female artist in the history of the chart. The same publication ranked Carey at number four on their "Top 125 Artists of All Time" chart making her the top female act. In 2021, "Fantasy" was included on the new edition of Rolling Stone magazine's list of "The 500 Greatest Songs of All Time" at number 419.

Carey's holiday album Merry Christmas has sold over 15 million copies worldwide, and is the best-selling Christmas album of all time. It also produced the successful single "All I Want for Christmas Is You", which became the first holiday song to be certified Diamond by the Recording Industry Association of America, and the only holiday ringtone to reach multi-platinum status in the US. As of 2020, it has topped the Billboard Holiday 100 chart for a record-extending 44 cumulative weeks, of the chart's 49 total weeks since the list launched in 2011; it has topped the tally for 29 consecutive weeks, dating to the start of the 2015–2016 holiday season. It is the longest running number one song on the Holiday 100 since the chart's launch in 2011. In 2018, Carey became the first artist to replace herself at the number one spot on Billboard's Top R&B Albums chart with Caution being replaced by Merry Christmas. On November 24, 2019, the song won three Guinness World Records. Additionally, it holds the record for the most Spotify streams in a single day (over 17 million plays on December 24, 2020). In 2021, the song earned one billion streams on Spotify, making it both Carey's first song and the first holiday song overall to do so.

Carey experienced an enduring success in various Asian countries. She is the best-selling non-Asian artist in Japan; Music Box, Daydream, Butterfly and Merry Christmas all sold over 2 million copies in the country, with the latter one, being the fourth best-selling international album. Alone #1's was certified with a triple-Million award and holds the record as the best-selling international album. Her song "All I Want for Christmas Is You" is the third best-selling song by a non-Asian artist. In 2018, Sony Music Asia Pacific presented Carey with a certificate of achievement for 1.6 billion sales units in Asia-Pacific.

Other activities

Endorsements 
Declining offers to appear in commercials in the United States during her early career, Carey was not involved in brand marketing initiatives until 2006, when she participated in endorsements for Intel Centrino personal computers and launched a jewelry and accessories line for teenagers, Glamorized, in American Claire's and Icing stores. During this period, as part of a partnership with Pepsi and Motorola, Carey recorded and promoted a series of exclusive ringtones, including "Time of Your Life". She signed a licensing deal with the cosmetics company Elizabeth Arden, and in 2007, she released her own fragrance, "M". The Elizabeth Arden deal has netted her $150 million. For the fragrance, Carey won a Basenotes Fragrance Award for Best Celebrity Women's Fragrance as well as being nominated in three other categories. She has released a series of fragrances with Elizabeth Arden, including Luscious Pink (2008) and Forever (2009). On November 29, 2010, she debuted a collection on HSN, which included jewelry, shoes and fragrances. In November 2011, Carey was announced as "brand ambassador" for Jenny Craig which included "participation in a new company initiative... public service announcements and community and education programs." In 2018, Carey featured in an advertisement for Hostelworld with the tagline "Even Divas are Believers".

On August 25, 2019, Carey signed a $12 million contract with the Walkers crisps brand as part of their Christmas campaign and starred in a commercial for the company. In conjunction with the 25th anniversary release of Merry Christmas in 2019, she organized a gift guide with Amazon, and partnered for an exclusive Christmas ornament with Swarovski. In December 2020, Carey launched a partnership with Virtual Dining Concepts and restaurateur, Robert Earl, for a biscuit line titled Mariah's Cookies. In 2021, Carey announced the launch of a new line of alcohol called Black Irish, an homage to her Black, Venezuelan, and Irish heritage. That same year, Carey also partnered with McDonald's, promoting an entirely new limited time menu. In 2022, Carey recorded nine video lessons for MasterClass titled "Mariah Carey Teaches the Voice as an Instrument", as well as re-recording "The Roof (Back in Time)" alongside Brandy.

Philanthropy and activism 
Carey is a philanthropist who has been involved with several charitable organizations. She became associated with the Fresh Air Fund in the early 1990s, and is the co-founder of a camp located in Fishkill, New York, that enables inner-city youth to embrace the arts and introduces them to career opportunities. The camp was called Camp Mariah "for her generous support and dedication to Fresh Air children," and she received a Congressional Horizon Award for her youth-related charity work. Carey has continued her direct involvement with Camp Mariah, and by 2019 the executive director of The Fresh Air Fund reported that "...the kids who have gone to Camp Mariah have higher graduation rates out of high school and college. In 1999, Carey was presented with a Congressional Award for contributing "to expanding opportunities for all Americans through their own personal contributions, and [setting] exceptional examples for young people through their own successes in life. In 2019, she was honoured by Varietys Power of Women for her work with The Fresh Air Fund's Camp Mariah.

Carey also donated royalties from her hits "Hero" and "One Sweet Day" to charities. She has worked with the Make-A-Wish Foundation, and in November 2006 she was awarded the Foundation's Wish Idol for her "extraordinary generosity and her many wish granting achievements." Carey has volunteered for the Police Athletic League of New York City and contributed to the obstetrics department of New York Presbyterian Hospital Cornell Medical Center. A percentage of the sales of MTV Unplugged was donated to various other charities. In 2008, Carey was named Hunger Ambassador of the World Hunger Relief Movement. In February 2010, the song, "100%", which was originally written and recorded for the film, Precious, was used as one of the theme songs for the 2010 Winter Olympics, with all money proceeds going to Team USA. Carey is also a supporter and advocate for the LGBT community, and was honored with the "Ally Award" at the 27th GLAAD Media Awards in May 2016. The award is presented to media figures who have "consistently used their platform to support and advance LGBT equality and acceptance".

One of Carey's most high-profile benefit concert appearances was on VH1's 1998 Divas Live special, during which she performed alongside other female singers in support of the Save the Music Foundation. The concert was a ratings success, and Carey participated in the Divas 2000 special and a 2016 holiday edition. In 2007, the Save the Music Foundation honored Carey at their tenth gala event for her support towards the foundation since its inception. She appeared at the America: A Tribute to Heroes nationally televised fundraiser in the aftermath of the September 11 attacks, and in December 2001, she performed before peacekeeping troops in Kosovo. Carey hosted the CBS television special At Home for the Holidays, which documented real-life stories of adopted children and foster families. In 2005, Carey performed for Live 8 in London and at the Hurricane Katrina relief telethon "Shelter from the Storm." In August 2008, Carey and other singers recorded the charity single, "Just Stand Up" produced by Babyface and L. A. Reid, to support Stand Up to Cancer.

On March 29, 2020, Carey was one of the headliners for the iHeart Living Room Concert for America hosted by Elton John, where she performed her song "Always Be My Baby". The event raised over $8 million in the fight against COVID-19. Carey also was one of the headliners for the Rise Up New York! virtual hour-long telethon, hosted by actress Tina Fey. The event aired on May 12, 2020, and was intended to raise money for those affected by the COVID-19 pandemic. She performed her songs "Through the Rain" and "Make It Happen". The event raised over $115 million. In response to the murder of George Floyd, Carey took to social media and sang a snippet of her 1990 song "There's Got to Be a Way" while encouraging fans to demand justice for Floyd saying, "I wrote this song for my first album. Still looking for answers today. We have to make a change. We can't be silent."

 Controversies 
In 2008, Carey performed in a New Year's Eve concert for the family of Libyan dictator Muammar Gaddafi. She later said she felt "horrible and embarrassed" to have taken part in the concert. To make amends, in March 2011, Carey's representative Cindi Berger stated that royalties for the song "Save the Day", written for her fourteenth studio album, would be donated to charities that create awareness for human rights. Berger also said that Carey "has and continues to donate her time, money and countless hours of personal service to many organizations both here and abroad." "Save the Day" remained unreleased until 2020. In 2013, human rights activists criticized Carey for performing in a concert for Angola's "father-daughter kleptocracy" and accused her of accepting "dictator cash".

In January 2019, Carey performed in Saudi Arabia, which drew backlash. Owen Jones of The Guardian observed that Carey has a large gay fanbase and that homosexuality in Saudi Arabia is punishable by death. She had been pressured to cancel the performance because of the murder of journalist Jamal Khashoggi and because of Saudi Arabia's imprisonment of feminists. In a statement to the Associated Press, Carey's publicist said: "Presented with the offer to perform for an international and mixed gender audience in Saudi Arabia, Mariah accepted the opportunity as a positive step towards the dissolution of gender segregation... As the first female international artist to perform in Saudi Arabia, Mariah recognizes the cultural significance of this event and will continue to support global efforts towards equality for all."

In March 2021 Carey attempted to trademark the phrase "Queen of Christmas" so that it could be used by her company Lotion LLC. Darlene Love protested, saying David Letterman gave her the title about thirty years earlier. Elizabeth Chan filed an official objection, saying she was "music's only full-time Christmas singer-songwriter" and that people had also called her "Queen of Christmas". For her daughter, Chan had also used the brand "Princess of Christmas", which Carey's company also wanted. In November 2022 the Trial Trademark and Appeal Board rejected Carey's request.

 Personal life 
Carey began dating Tommy Mottola while recording Mariah Carey, and they were married in New York City on June 5, 1993, during a half-million dollar ceremony at Saint Thomas Church. The newlyweds moved into a custom-built mansion referred to by Carey as "Sing Sing" located on a 51-acre estate in Bedford, New York, alluding to her feeling imprisoned there. After the release of Daydream and the success that followed, Carey began focusing on her personal life, which was a constant struggle at the time. Their relationship began to deteriorate due to their growing creative differences in terms of her music as well as Mottola's controlling nature. They announced their separation on May 30, 1997, and their divorce was finalized by the time Mottola remarried on December 2, 2000. In 1998, their home together was sold for $20.5 million to Nelson Peltz and burned down in 1999.

Carey was in a relationship with singer Luis Miguel from 1998 to 2001. She met actor and comedian Nick Cannon while they shot the music video for her song "Bye Bye" on an island off the coast of Antigua. They were married on April 30, 2008, in the Bahamas. In the same year, Carey suffered a miscarriage. At 35 weeks into her next pregnancy, she gave birth to their fraternal twins, Moroccan and Monroe, on April 30, 2011, via Cesarean section. In August 2014, Cannon confirmed he and Carey had separated. He filed for divorce on December 12, 2014, which was finalized in 2016.

In 2015, Carey began dating Australian billionaire James Packer and, on January 21, 2016, she announced they were engaged. By October, however, they had called off the engagement. In October 2016, she began dating American choreographer Bryan Tanaka.

Carey is an active Episcopalian. She stated in 2006: "I do believe that I have been born again in a lot of ways. I think what I've changed are my priorities and my relationships with God. I feel the difference when I don't have my private moments to pray... I'm a fighter, but I learned that I'm not in charge. Whatever God wants to happen is what's going to happen. I feel like I've had endless second, third, fourth, fifth and sixth chances. It's by the grace of God I'm still here." In April 2018, Carey opened up about taking therapy sessions and medication for her struggle with bipolar II disorder. She was diagnosed in 2001 and initially kept the diagnosis private.

 Discography 

 Mariah Carey (1990)
 Emotions (1991)
 Music Box (1993)
 Merry Christmas (1994)
 Daydream (1995)
 Butterfly (1997)
 Rainbow (1999)
 Glitter (2001)
 Charmbracelet (2002)
 The Emancipation of Mimi (2005)
 E=MC² (2008)
 Memoirs of an Imperfect Angel (2009)
 Merry Christmas II You (2010)
 Me. I Am Mariah... The Elusive Chanteuse (2014)
 Caution (2018)

 Filmography 

 The Bachelor (1999)
 Glitter (2001)
 WiseGirls (2002)
 Death of a Dynasty (2003)
 State Property 2 (2005)
 Tennessee (2008)
 You Don't Mess with the Zohan (2008)
 Precious (2009)
 The Butler (2013)
 A Christmas Melody (2015)
 Popstar: Never Stop Never Stopping (2016)
 The Keys of Christmas (2016)
 The Lego Batman Movie (2017)
 Girls Trip (2017)
 The Star (2017)
 All I Want for Christmas Is You (2017)
 Mariah Carey's Magical Christmas Special (2020)
 Mariah's Christmas: The Magic Continues (2021)

 Tours and residencies  Headlining tours  Music Box Tour (1993)
 Daydream World Tour (1996)
 Butterfly World Tour (1998)
 Rainbow World Tour (2000)
 Charmbracelet World Tour (2003–2004)
 The Adventures of Mimi (2006)
 Angels Advocate Tour (2009–2010)
 Australian Tour 2013 (2013)
 The Elusive Chanteuse Show (2014)
 The Sweet Sweet Fantasy Tour (2016)
 Mariah Carey: Live in Concert (2018)
 Caution World Tour (2019) Co-headlining tours  All the Hits Tour (with Lionel Richie) (2017) Residencies '''
 Live at the Pearl (2009)
 All I Want for Christmas Is You: A Night of Joy and Festivity (2014–2019)
 #1 to Infinity (2015–2017)
 The Butterfly Returns (2018–2020)

 Written works 
 
 
 

 See also 

 List of best-selling singles
 List of best-selling albums
 List of best-selling female music artists
 List of best-selling music artists in the United States
 List of Billboard Hot 100 chart achievements and milestones
 List of artists who reached number one on the Billboard Hot 100
 List of artists who reached number one on the US dance chart
 Artists with the most number-ones on the US dance chart
 Forbes list of highest-earning musicians

 Notes 

 References 

 Sources 

 
 
 
 
 
 
 
 
 
 
 

 Further reading 
 Fred Bronson's Billboard Book of Number 1 Hits, 5th Edition
 Joel Whitburn Presents the Billboard Hot 100 Charts: The Sixties
 Joel Whitburn Presents the Billboard Hot 100 Charts: The Nineties
 Additional information concerning Carey's chart history can be retrieved and verified in Billboard's'' online archive services and print editions of the magazine.

External links 

 
 
 
 

 
1969 births
20th-century African-American women singers
20th-century American actresses
21st-century African-American women singers
21st-century American actresses
21st-century American businesspeople
21st-century American businesswomen
Actresses from New York (state)
African-American actresses
African-American Episcopalians
African-American women singer-songwriters
African-American women in business
Age controversies
American autobiographers
American contemporary R&B singers
American women pop singers
American film actresses
American music arrangers
American music video directors
American people of Irish descent
American people of Venezuelan descent
American sopranos
American television actresses
American voice actresses
Ballad musicians
Columbia Records artists
Dance-pop musicians
Def Jam Recordings artists
Epic Records artists
Female music video directors
Grammy Award winners
Hispanic and Latino American actresses
Hispanic and Latino American women singers
Island Records artists
Living people
Music video codirectors
Judges in American reality television series
People from Greenlawn, New York
People with bipolar disorder
Philanthropists from New York (state)
Singer-songwriters from New York (state)
Singers with a five-octave vocal range
Virgin Records artists
Women autobiographers
World Music Awards winners